"Ms Grace" was a popular single by The Tymes. The song was written by John Hall and Johanna Hall and produced by Billy Jackson and Mike Chapman.

Background
"Ms Grace" was The Tymes sole number one in the UK Singles Chart, spending a single week at the top of the chart in January 1975. It fared less well in the US where it peaked at No. 91 on the Billboard Hot 100 singles chart and No. 75 on the Hot Soul Singles chart. In spite of its low US peak, it was a local hit within Carolina Beach Music, where it became a standard.

Charts

References

1974 singles
The Tymes songs
UK Singles Chart number-one singles
1974 songs
Song recordings produced by Mike Chapman
Songs written by John Hall (New York politician)